Florian Schnorrenberg (born 16 April 1977) is a German football manager and former player, who last managed Hallescher FC.

References

1977 births
Living people
German football managers
3. Liga managers
SG Sonnenhof Großaspach managers
Hallescher FC managers